Mikulčice is a municipality and village in Hodonín District in the South Moravian Region of the Czech Republic. It has about 2,000 inhabitants.

Administrative parts

The village of Těšice is an administrative part of Mikulčice. Mikulčice and Těšice are urbanistically fused.

Geography
It lies in a flat landscape of the Lower Morava Valley. The municipality is crossed by the river Kyjovka. The Czech-Slovak border is formed here by the Morava River.

History

From the 6th until the 10th century, a Slavic fortified settlement existed 3 km southeast from the modern village on the site called Mikulčice-Valy. The settlement was one of the main centres of the Great Moravian Empire, plausibly its capital city. Excavations, led by Josef Poulík, unearthed the remnants of twelve churches, a palace, and more than 2,500 graves (including a horse burial).

The first written mention of Mikulčice is from 1141. The parish Church of the Assumption of the Virgin Mary was first mentioned in 1353. At the beginning of the 15th century, a fortress stood here. The fortress was probably destroyed during the Hussite Wars.

The village was heavily damaged by the 2021 South Moravia tornado.

Economy
The local economy is predominantly based on agriculture and tourism.

Sights
The Mikulčice-Valy site is the main tourist attraction. It is freely accessible. It includes an exhibition with archeological finds from this area, administered by the Masaryk Museum in Hodonín. Since 1962, the site has been protected as a national cultural monument.

Notable people
Miloslav Balun (1920–1994), pair skater

References

External links

 
Mikulčice-Valy archaelogical site 

Villages in Hodonín District
Great Moravia
Moravian Slovakia